The Stationmaster is a 1925 Soviet drama film directed by Ivan Moskvin and Yuri Zhelyabuzhsky and starring Moskvin and Vera Malinovskaya. It is an adaptation of Alexander Pushkin's 1831 short story "The Stationmaster".

The film's sets were designed by the art director Ivan Stepanov.

Cast
 Vera Malinovskaya as Dunja  
 Ivan Moskvin as Postmaster  
 Vsevolod Aksyonov 
 Nikolai Aleksandrov 
 Nikolai Kostromskoy 
 Nikolai Ryzhov 
 Boris Tamarin
 Vladimir Uralsky

References

Bibliography
 Cowie, Peter. Before 1940: A Concise History of the Cinema. A. Zwemmer, 1971.

External links 
 

1925 films
1925 drama films
Soviet drama films
Soviet silent feature films
1920s Russian-language films
Russian drama films
Films based on Russian novels
Films based on works by Aleksandr Pushkin
Soviet black-and-white films
Russian black-and-white films
Russian silent feature films
Silent drama films